Ceadîr-Lunga (also spelled Ceadâr-Lunga; Gagauz: Çadır-Lunga) is a city and municipality in Gagauzia, Moldova.

Culture

Sports 
The city is represented by FC Saxan Gagauz Yeri in Moldovan Liga 2, the third tier of Moldovan football. The club play their matches in Ceadîr-Lunga Stadium.

Demographics  
The city's population is 19,401, of which the declared ethnicities are:
14,294 Gagauzians
1,552 Russians
1,510 Bulgarians
734 Moldovans
951 Ukrainians
166 Gypsies
8 Poles
7 Jews
179 other/undeclared.

Twin towns – Sister cities
Ceadîr-Lunga is twinned with:
 Bursa, Turkey
 Serpukhov, Russia
 Titusville, Florida, United States

Gallery

References

External links 

Official website

Cities and towns in Moldova
Municipalities of Moldova
Bendersky Uyezd
Tighina County (Romania)
Ținutul Nistru
Gagauzia